Roy Wilkins (1901–1981) was a prominent activist in the Civil Rights Movement in the United States from the 1930s to the 1970s.

Roy Wilkins may also refer to:

People
 Roy Wilkins (American football) (1933–2002), American football linebacker
 Roy Wilkins (cricketer) (1892–1965), Australian cricketer

Other uses
 Roy Wilkins Auditorium, a 5,000-seat multi-purpose arena in St. Paul, Minnesota
 Roy Wilkins Park, a 54-acre park in the St. Albans neighborhood of southeastern Queens in New York City
 Roy Wilkins Renown Service Award, an award created by the National Association for the Advancement of Colored People